The Pacific spaghetti eel (Gorgasia japonica) is a sand dwelling eel in the family Congridae (conger/garden eels). It was described by Tokiharu Abe, M. Miki and Minoru Asai in 1977. It is a marine, temperate water-dwelling eel which is known from the northwestern and southwestern Pacific Ocean, including Japan (from which its species epithet is derived) and New Zealand. It is non-migratory, and inhabits sand flats near reefs. Spaghetti eels will typically occur in large groups that can consist of hundreds of eels. 

The Pacific spaghetti eel's diet consists of zooplankton.

References

Gorgasia
Fish described in 1977
Taxa named by Tokiharu Abe